The 2003 IIHF World U18 Championship Division I was a pair of international under-18 ice hockey tournaments run by the International Ice Hockey Federation. The Division I tournaments made up the second level of competition at the 2003 IIHF World U18 Championships. The Group A tournament took place between 23 and 29 March 2003 in Ventspils, Latvia and the Group B tournament took place between 22 and 28 March 2003 in Briançon, France. Denmark and Norway won the Group A and Group B tournaments respectively and gained promotion to the Championship Division for the 2004 IIHF World U18 Championships. While Great Britain finished last in Group A and Ukraine last in Group B and were both relegated to Division II for 2004.

Group A tournament
The Group A tournament began on 23 March 2003 in Ventspils, Latvia. Denmark, Japan, Latvia and Slovenia all returned to compete in this year's Division I tournament after missing promotion to the Championship Division at the previous years World Championship. Great Britain gained promotion to Division I after finishing third in last years Division II tournament and Germany was relegated from the Championship Division after failing to survive the relegation round at the 2002 IIHF World U18 Championships. Denmark won the tournament after finishing first in the group standings and gained promotion to the Championship Division for the 2004 IIHF World U18 Championships. Germany finished second losing only to Denmark and Slovenia finished in third place. Great Britain finished in last place after losing all five of their games and were relegated back to Division II for the 2004 IIHF World U18 Championships. Martin Nielsen of Denmark finished as the top scorer of the tournament with eleven points including four goals and seven assists. Japan's Kaku Asari finished the tournament as the leading goaltender based on save percentage.

Standings

Fixtures
All times local.

Scoring leaders
List shows the top ten skaters sorted by points, then goals.

Leading goaltenders
Only the top five goaltenders, based on save percentage, who have played 40% of their team's minutes are included in this list.

Group B tournament
The Group B tournament began on 22 March 2003 in Briançon, France. Austria and Italy both returned to compete in this year's Division I tournament after missing promotion to the Championship Division at the previous years World Championship. France and Poland gained promotion to Division I after finishing first and second respectively in last years Division II tournament and Norway and Ukraine were relegated from the Championship Division after failing to survive the relegation round at the 2002 IIHF World U18 Championships. Norway won the tournament after finishing first in the group standings and gained promotion to the Championship Division for the 2004 IIHF World U18 Championships. Poland finished second after winning three of their games and drawing the fourth and Italy finished in third place. Ukraine finished in last place after finishing last in the group standings and were relegated to Division II for the 2004 IIHF World U18 Championships. Marcin Kolusz of Poland finished as the top scorer of the tournament with seven points including four goals and three assists. Poland's Bartosz Stepokura finished the tournament as the leading goaltender based on save percentage.

Standings

Fixtures
All times local.

Scoring leaders
List shows the top ten skaters sorted by points, then goals.

Leading goaltenders
Only the top five goaltenders, based on save percentage, who have played 40% of their team's minutes are included in this list.

References

IIHF World U18 Championship Division I
World
I
2003
2003
IIHF World U18 Championship Division I